Lee Sang-joon (born 13 November 1992) is a South Korean badminton player who joined the South Korea national badminton team in 2011. In the national events, he played for the MG Saemaul Geumgo team. He was the runner-up at the 2012 India Open Grand Prix Gold in the men's doubles event.

Achievements

BWF Grand Prix 
The BWF Grand Prix had two levels, the BWF Grand Prix and Grand Prix Gold. It was a series of badminton tournaments sanctioned by the Badminton World Federation (BWF) which was held from 2007 to 2017.

Men's doubles

  BWF Grand Prix Gold tournament
  BWF Grand Prix tournament

Filmography

Television show

References

External links 
 

1992 births
Living people
South Korean male badminton players